Ednel Javier Báez (born December 1, 1992), nicknamed "El Mago" (Spanish for "The Magician"), is a Puerto Rican professional baseball shortstop for the Detroit Tigers of Major League Baseball (MLB). He previously played in MLB for the Chicago Cubs and New York Mets.

Born in Puerto Rico, Báez attended high school in Jacksonville, Florida. The Cubs selected Báez with the ninth overall selection of the 2011 MLB draft. He made his MLB debut in 2014 and played for the Cubs for eight years before he was traded to the Mets in 2021. After the 2021 season, he entered free agency where he then signed a six-year contract with the Tigers.

Báez was named the National League Championship Series co-MVP alongside left-handed starter Jon Lester as the Chicago Cubs clinched their 2016 National League pennant en route to winning the 2016 World Series. He is a two-time All-Star, and has also won the Silver Slugger Award. He is also the cover athlete for MLB The Show 20.

Early life and introduction to baseball
Born and raised in Puerto Rico, Báez moved to Florida in 2005 along with his mother and siblings, two brothers and a sister. The move was so that his sister, Noely, could get medical treatment for her spina bifida condition. In Puerto Rico he and his two brothers, Gadiel and Rolando, became familiar with the sport through their father, Ángel Luis Báez who, before his death when Javier was ten, heavily influenced their life and was responsible for their interest in baseball. The brothers would later immortalize this interest by getting tattoos of Major League Baseball's logo, which symbolized that "baseball has been in [their] lives forever." As a middle school student, it took time for Báez to adapt because he was unable to fluently speak or understand English. Báez eventually learned the language through trial and error in a process that lasted for three years, memorizing words before knowing their actual meaning.

Báez attended Arlington Country Day School (ACD) in Jacksonville, Florida. His coach at ACD, Ron Dickerson, noted that initially scouts were not impressed by him, noting his talent, but not believing he could become a star. Dickerson emphasized that Báez's work ethic was responsible for positioning him as a real prospect. As a sophomore, he had a .463 batting average with 38 hits, of which nine were doubles and 13 were home runs. Making 82 plate appearances in 25 games, he also gathered 60 runs batted in (RBIs). By the time that his junior season was over, Báez was a highly rated Aflac All-American. In his senior season, he recorded 64 hits in 83 at-bats to gather an average of .771, which included 20 doubles and 22 home runs. In total, Báez recorded 52 RBIs in 30 games. During his time at ACD, he never played a position steadily. After working at second base, Báez was moved to shortstop once the team lost a player. Besides these positions, he also played as a center fielder and as a catcher. He committed to play college baseball at Jacksonville University.

Professional career

Minor leagues
The Chicago Cubs, led by Jim Hendry, selected Báez in the first round, with the ninth overall selection, of the 2011 Major League Baseball draft. He began his professional career by playing shortstop for the Arizona Cubs of the Rookie-level Arizona League, where he only played in three games, recording three hits, including two doubles, in 12 at-bats and two stolen bases. Promoted to the Boise Hawks of the Class A-Short Season Northwest League, Báez recorded one single in six at bats across two games. On September 29, 2011, he was selected third overall by the Leones de Ponce in the Liga de Béisbol Profesional Roberto Clemente's (LBPRC) rookie draft, but did not play due to the Cubs' limitations.

Before the 2012 season, MLB.com rated Báez as the 62nd best prospect in baseball. He remained with the Cubs in extended spring training with other prospects, participating in 26 games and hitting 6 doubles, 3 triples, and 8 home runs, with 28 RBI, 11 stolen bases, and 23 strikeouts in 94 plate appearances. He made his regular season debut with the Peoria Chiefs of the Class A Midwest League. He was promoted to the Daytona Cubs of the Class A-Advanced Florida State League (FSL). Baseball America included Báez in two of its "Best Tools" lists, naming him the "Most Exciting Player in the Midwest League" and the "Best Defensive Infielder" in the Chicago Cubs system.

Before the 2013 season, MLB.com rated Báez as the 16th best prospect in baseball. The Cubs invited him to join their major league team in spring training, competing in the Cactus League. Báez hit four home runs in five at-bats over the course of two games, including in an unofficial exhibition game against the Japanese national baseball team that was preparing for the 2013 World Baseball Classic. He concluded spring training with a .298 batting average and 10 RBIs. Báez returned to the Daytona Cubs to open the 2013 season. On June 10, 2013, Báez hit four home runs in one game, becoming the second player to do so in the history of the FSL. Báez was named one of the five finalists in the fan vote for the final spot on the World Team's roster for the 2013 All-Star Futures Game, but he finished second to Carlos Correa.

On July 6, 2013, the Cubs promoted Báez to the Tennessee Smokies of the Class AA Southern League after displaying more plate discipline and walking more often during the previous month. Báez was named to both the FSL and Southern League All-Star teams at the conclusion of the season. The Cubs named him their Minor League Player of the Year, closing the season as the top-ranked prospect in the team's system and third overall in the Southern League. On October 28, 2013, Báez won the MiLBY Award for Best Minor League Game of the Year, recognizing his four-home run game.

The Cubs invited Báez to spring training in 2014. An injury suffered by Starlin Castro allowed him regular playing time. To increase his versatility, Báez began practicing at second base and third base. He was reassigned to Minor League camp during the final week of spring training. Bothered by a back injury, he opened his participation with the Iowa Cubs of the Class AAA International League (IL) immersed in a slump, with his only hit in 20 at bats being the first home run of the season. During the second week of the season, Báez had his first multi-hit game and hit a second home run before being placed on the seven-day disabled list with an ankle sprain. Báez slumped following his return, and his batting average fell below .150 in May, while his strikeout-to-walk ratio worsened. With a more patient approach at the plate, Báez began a hitting streak on May 16, 2014. On May 26, 2014, Báez was named the PCL Player of the Week for the previous week.

On May 22, 2014, the Cangrejeros de Santurce of the LBPRC signed Báez by exploiting a legal loophole that allowed players to be considered free agents unless properly signed within three years of being drafted. However, the Leones de Ponce quickly reclaimed his local player rights, claiming that they had approached him with the intent of formalizing a contract but that the "extreme fatigue" clause of the Winter League Agreement had interfered.

Chicago Cubs

2014
On August 5, the Cubs promoted Báez to the major leagues. In his debut that day, he hit his first career home run; the game-winner in the 12th inning victory against the Colorado Rockies, becoming the first player since Miguel Cabrera in 2003 to hit an extra innings home run in his debut. In his third game, Báez hit two home runs, becoming the first player since Joe Cunningham in 1954 to hit three home runs in his first three MLB games. On August 18, 2014, Báez hit his fifth home run in 14 games, joining Jason Kipnis as the only other second baseman to do so in the last 100 years.

On September 2, Castro injured himself in an awkward slide at home plate in which he sprained his left ankle rendering him unable to play for the remainder of the season. Báez finished the season at shortstop. In 52 games with the Cubs in 2014, Báez struck out 95 times while batting .169 with 5 stolen bases, 9 home runs, and 20 RBI.

2015
After struggling in spring training, mostly due to a high number of strikeouts, the Cubs optioned Báez to Iowa on March 30, 2015. He batted .324 in 70 games for Iowa, missing time due to the death of his sister and a broken finger.

At the end of Iowa's season, Báez was called up to the major leagues as a part of September call-ups on September 1. Báez hit his first home run of the season on September 4 in a win over the Arizona Diamondbacks. His three-run home run in the second inning of game 4 of the National League Division Series against the St. Louis Cardinals helped the Cubs to a 6–4 win as they advanced to the National League Championship Series.

2016

On May 8, in the last game of a four-game series at Wrigley Field, Báez hit a solo home run in the bottom of the 13th inning to lead the Cubs to a 4–3 victory and a four-game sweep of the Washington Nationals.  On June 28, Báez hit a grand slam in the 15th inning to lead the Cubs in a win over the Cincinnati Reds.

In Game 1 of the 2016 National League Division Series against the San Francisco Giants, Báez hit a solo home run off Giants starter Johnny Cueto in the 8th inning to account for the only run in a 1–0 Cubs victory. It was the first 1–0 win in a playoff game for the Cubs since game 4 of the 1906 World Series against the Chicago White Sox. In Game 4, Báez drove in Jason Heyward to cap off a four-run rally in the top of the ninth, sending the Cubs to the 2016 National League Championship Series with a 6–5 victory.

During the first game of the 2016 National League Championship Series against the Los Angeles Dodgers, Báez stole home in the second inning.  He was the first Cub to do this in a postseason game since 1907 when Jimmy Slagle accomplished this against the Detroit Tigers in game four of the 1907 World Series.  Báez is also only one of 19 players in baseball history to steal home in a playoff game. Báez and Jon Lester were named NLCS co-MVPs, after Báez hit .318 with five RBIs, four doubles, and two stolen bases in the series, including three hits and three RBIs in Game 5. Baez would be part of the Cubs 2016 World Series win against the Cleveland Indians in 7 games, earning him his first World Series championship. Báez was the recipient of the Fielding Bible Award for his "defensive excellence at multiple positions."

2017
The ability of Báez to apply quick tags of opposing players attempting to steal second base was acknowledged as among the best ever. Cubs manager Joe Maddon said, "A lot of our success is based on defense, and Javy is so important to that." Báez finished the 2017 regular season with a .273 average, 23 home runs, 24 doubles, 75 RBIs, 75 runs scored, and 10 stolen bases. He was a consistent member of the Cubs starting lineup at second base (573 innings) and at shortstop (503 innings) filling in for the injured Addison Russell. Báez was 0-for-23 in the NLCS except for the two solo home runs during Game 4. Báez was the recipient of the Fielding Bible's Multi-Position award for the second straight season.
John Dewan of the FB organization stated, "Báez possesses arm strength that is above average when he plays on the left side of the diamond, and it becomes downright ridiculous when he is playing second base," says Dewan. "He believes he can make every throw on the diamond, and the vast majority of the time he is correct."

2018: All-Star season
On April 10, Báez hit two home runs against the Pittsburgh Pirates. The next day against the Pirates, Báez hit two home runs again. On May 19, Amir Garrett of the Cincinnati Reds struck out Báez and yelled in excitement. Báez approached Garrett and a benches-clearing brawl ensued. On May 27, in an 8–3 victory against the San Francisco Giants, Báez hit his 13th home run of the year and became the first Cubs player with at least 40 RBIs before Memorial Day since Derrek Lee in 2005.

On July 9, while batting .294 with 17 home runs, 63 RBIs, and 16 stolen bases, Báez was named the starting second baseman for the 2018 MLB All-Star Game, his first All-Star selection. Báez was only the second player in MLB history to have at least 18 home runs, 18 doubles, 18 stolen bases, and 5 triples by the All-Star break, Willie Mays was the first. Báez also participated in the 2018 Home Run Derby. On August 23, Báez hit a 481-foot home run, the third-longest home run in the MLB in 2018. On September 2, Báez hit his 30th home run of the year and scored his 100th RBI and was the first Cubs middle infielder since 1990 to achieve both in the same year.

In 2018, Báez had 606 at-bats with 176 hits and a batting average of .290. He hit 34 home runs, drove in a league leading 111 RBIs and stole 21 bases. He swung and missed at 18.2% of the pitches he saw, second behind only Jorge Alfaro (23.8%) in the NL. He finished second to Christian Yelich of the Milwaukee Brewers in the selection of the Most Valuable Player in the National League. In 2018, Baez was one of three players to record at least 30 home runs, 100 RBI, 100 runs and 20 steals; the other two players were Yelich and Jose Ramirez.

2019: Second All-Star season
Having played 25 games at the shortstop position, Báez was leading in most team hitting statistics. He had 35 hits in 111 plate appearances with 9 home runs and a batting average of .333. He had 22 RBIs, 15 of which were with 2 outs which led all NL hitters. He continued to display remarkable base-running ability and technique.

Báez hit his 100th career home run on June 23, 2019, off of Seth Lugo against the New York Mets. In July, he was named to his second All-Star Game. Báez also hit lefty in a blowout win vs the Reds with Catcher Kyle Farmer pitching. On May 19, Báez injured his heel while making a barehanded pickup and throw on a grounder. Following his injury, Baez had a slash line of .259/.287/.490 with a 96 wRC+, 27.1% strikeout rate, and 3.9% walk rate until he suffered a fractured thumb on September 1, during a headfirst slide into second base. This effectively ended his 2019 season, though he did have a few pinch hitting and pinch running appearances during the last few games of the year in an effort to boost a slumping Cubs team.

Báez placed 5th in the National League in errors with 15. He finished 10th among 15 qualified National League shortstops in fielding percentage. Overall, Báez batted a respectable .281 with 29 home runs and 85 RBIs.

2020
In 2020, Báez batted .203/.238/.360 in 222 at-bats, and he had the lowest on-base percentage of all qualified NL batters. Báez attributed his struggles at the plate with the ban of in-game video review that the MLB implemented in the aftermath of the Houston Astros' sign-stealing scandal. Báez said, "To be honest, it sucks because I make my adjustments during the game...I watch my swing, I watch where the ball went, where the contact was. I'm mad. I'm really mad about that we don't have it."

His .581 OPS, .249 wOPA, and 52 wRC+ all ranked dead last, and was at least 21% worse than league average. He also struck out 10 times more frequently than he walked. "

2021
On May 27, 2021, with a runner on second and two outs, Báez hit a routine ground ball to the third baseman, who threw to first for the put-out. The throw pulled the first baseman off the bag toward home plate, which allowed the Cubs player on second (Willson Contreras) to safely reach third, who briefly paused in anticipation for the tag out. Instead, Báez stopped his run and ran back towards home plate, with first baseman Will Craig approaching to tag Báez out. The ensuing chase allowed an opportunity for the runner on third an attempt at home plate. The first baseman tossed the ball to the catcher, who missed a swipe tag on Contreras, who was sliding towards home plate. In the meantime, Báez headed to a now-unoccupied first base, which caused second baseman Adam Frazier to rush towards first, but catcher Michael Pérez threw behind Frazier and thus enabled Báez to safely reach first. Báez was able to advance to second base on the wild throw. Báez was ruled to have reached first on an error by the first baseman, and then to have advanced to second on another error by the catcher.

New York Mets
On July 30, 2021, Baez was traded to the New York Mets along with Trevor Williams and cash considerations in exchange for Pete Crow-Armstrong.

He made his Mets debut on July 31 against the Cincinnati Reds. He went 1 for 4, the one hit being a 2-run home run. The Mets would go on to win the game 5-4.

On August 24, Javier Baez moved to second base after his childhood friend Francisco Lindor was activated off the injured list and took over his primary position at shortstop. On August 30, Baez received massive criticism for booing and giving a thumbs down towards Mets fans who booed them. Mets owner Steve Cohen stated that Baez's behavior was unacceptable. In the game following his controversial remarks, Baez scored a game-winning run to complete a Mets ninth-inning comeback against the Miami Marlins. Booing from Mets fans earlier in the game turned to cheers and thumbs up.

In 2021 he had the worst walk/strikeout ratio in the majors, at 0.15. He swung at and missed 21.7% of all pitches, the highest percentage in major league baseball.

Detroit Tigers

On December 1, 2021, Báez signed a six-year, $140 million contract with the Detroit Tigers.

In his Tigers debut on April 8, 2022, Báez hit a ninth-inning walk-off single to defeat the Chicago White Sox, 5–4. On April 16, the Tigers placed Báez on the 10-day injured list with right thumb soreness.

Over his first season in Detroit, Báez hit .238/.278/.393 with 67 RBI, while his 17 home runs were enough to lead a weak-hitting Tigers team. He swung at a higher percentage of pitches outside the strike zone (48.7%) than any other major league batter, and had the highest called strike plus whiff rate in the majors (32.2%).

International career

World Baseball Classic
Baéz played for the Puerto Rican national team in the 2017 World Baseball Classic where he won a silver medal. Báez averaged .296 with one home run, five runs batted in and four tournament leading stolen bases. Following the conclusion of the tournament, he was named to the 2017 All-World Baseball Classic team.

Personal life

Báez's sister, Noely, died on April 8, 2015, aged 21. She had spina bifida. Báez took a leave of absence from the Iowa Cubs to help cope with the loss. Báez is left-hand dominant and eats and writes with his left hand, and suggests this helps his game. On August 8, 2019, Báez batted left handed in a game for the first time against Kyle Farmer, an infielder pitching during a 12–5 blowout in the 9th inning. Báez chose "El Mago" (Spanish for "The Magician") as his nickname for the Players Weekend in 2017 and 2018.

Báez announced his engagement to longtime girlfriend Irmarie Márquez via Twitter on April 11, 2018. Their son was born on June 28, 2018. The couple was married in San Juan, Puerto Rico, on January 26, 2019. Báez's wife, Irmarie, is the sister of Jannieliz Márquez, who is married to Puerto Rican pitcher José Berríos.

See also
 List of Major League Baseball players from Puerto Rico

References

External links

1992 births
Living people
Arizona League Cubs players
Boise Hawks players
Chicago Cubs players
Daytona Cubs players
Detroit Tigers players
Gold Glove Award winners
Iowa Cubs players
Major League Baseball infielders
Major League Baseball left fielders
Major League Baseball players from Puerto Rico
Major League Baseball right fielders
Mesa Solar Sox players
National League All-Stars
National League Championship Series MVPs
National League RBI champions
New York Mets players
Sportspeople from Bayamón, Puerto Rico
Baseball players from Jacksonville, Florida
Peoria Chiefs players
Silver Slugger Award winners
Tennessee Smokies players
2017 World Baseball Classic players
2023 World Baseball Classic players